The Mordellidae are a family of beetles commonly known as tumbling flower beetles for the typical irregular movements they make when escaping predators, or as pintail beetles due to their abdominal tip which aids them in performing these tumbling movements. Worldwide, there are about 1500 species.

Anatomy 
The apparently tumbling movements are composed of a series of very rapid separate jumps (each jump of a duration of approximately 80 ms). They result from the beetle's efforts to get itself back into take-off position for flight when it has been in either lateral or dorsal position. Each individual jump should be considered as an extended rotation, performed by one leg of the third leg pair (metapodium). Depending on whether the left or the right metapodium is used as the leg that provides the leverage for take-off, change occurs in the direction of the jump. The energy for propulsion varies with the beetle's immediate muscle work, so that jump lengths and heights vary, with rotation frequencies recorded up to 48 per second  (Mordellochroa abdominalis)  around the gravitation centre of the body's longitudinal axis. Additional revolving around the transverse axis (at lower frequency) effects spiralling somersaults that are perceived as tumbling. The pintail (pygidium) is of no significance for the jump. While the pintail is no significance for the jump, meta-trochanter-femur (thighs and surrounding rings of the third leg pair)has a great capacity of free rotation (up to 270 degrees, at one level only). This capacity is due to a screw joint that connects the base of metacoxa to the head of trochanter. The nut gradient is 21 degrees (as seen under a scanning electron microscopy SEM, 1985).  Technically similar jumps, though less powerful, can be observed in family Melandryidae (=Serropalpidae) (genus Orchesia) and family Scraptiidae (genus Anaspis). Their coxa-trochanter-joints are of similar structure. It can be assumed that the capacity of a tumbling form of locomotion is rooted in a common phylogeny and can therefore not be ascribed specifically to Mordellidae.
Meanwhile, other authors have also pointed out the speciality of the real screw joint in nature. (2011)
The weevil of the genus Trigonopterus, Curculionidae in the Asian tropical rainforest, for example, has an even tighter connective construction in the Coxa -Trochanter joint than is found in Mordellidae. This construction, however, does not facilitate an equally high angular velocity of the torque. The joint here serves to provide a better grip on plants and easier climbing.

Systematics

This family has two living subfamilies – Mordellinae and Ctenidiinae – and a prehistoric one known only from fossils (Praemordellinae). Another fossil genus, Liaoximordella, was previously treated as distinct monotypic family Liaoximordellidae, but is now regarded as very primitive and probably basal member of the Mordellidae.

FAMILY Mordellidae Latreille, 1802
 Subfamily Ctenidiinae Franciscolo, 1951
 Ctenidia Laporte de Castelnau in Brullé, 1840
 Subfamily Mordellinae Latreille, 1802
 †Angimordella Bao et al. 2019 Burmese amber, Myanmar, Cenomanian
Tribe Conaliini Ermisch, 1956
 Conalia Mulsant & Rey, 1858
 Conaliamorpha Ermisch, 1968
 Glipodes LeConte, 1862
 Isotrilophus Liljeblad, 1945
 Ophthalmoconalia Ermisch, 1968
 Paraconalia Ermisch, 1968
 Pseudoconalia Ermisch, 1950
 Stenoconalia Ermisch, 1967
 Xanthoconalia Franciscolo, 1942
 Tribe Mordellini Siedlitz, 1875
 Adelptes Franciscolo, 1965
 †Asiamordella Hong, 2002 Fushun amber, China, Ypresian
 Austromordella Ermisch, 1950
 Binaghia Franciscolo, 1943
 Boatia Franciscolo, 1985
 Caffromorda Franciscolo, 1952
 Calycina Blair, 1922
 Cephaloglipa Franciscolo, 1952
 Congomorda Ermisch, 1955
 Cothurus Champion, 1891
 Curtimorda Méquignon, 1946
 Glipa LeConte, 1859
 Glipidiomorpha Franciscolo, 1952
 Hoshihananomia Kônô, 1935
 Iberomorda Méquignon, 1946
 Ideorhipistena Franciscolo, 2000
 Klapperichimorda Ermisch, 1968
 Larinomorda Ermisch, 1968
 Machairophora Franciscolo, 1943
 Macrotomoxia Píc, 1922
 Mordella Linnaeus, 1758
 Mordellina Schilsky, 1908
 Mordellapygium Ray, 1930
 Mordellaria Ermisch, 1950
 Mordelloides Ray, 1939
 Mordellopalpus Franciscolo, 1955
 Neocurtimorda Franciscolo, 1950
 Neotomoxia Ermisch, 1950
 Ophthalmoglipa Franciscolo, 1952
 Paramordella Píc, 1936
 Paramordellana Ermisch, 1968
 Paramordellaria Ermisch, 1968
 Paraphungia Ermisch, 1969
 Parastenomordella Ermisch, 1950
 Paratomoxia Ermisch, 1950
 Paratomoxioda Ermisch, 1954
 Phungia Píc, 1922
 Plesitomoxia Ermisch, 1955
 Praemordella Shchegoleva-Barovskaya, 1929
 Pseudomordellaria Ermisch, 1950
 Pseudotomoxia Ermisch, 1950
 Sphaeromorda Franciscolo, 1950
 Stenaliamorda Ermisch & Chûjô, 1968
 Stenomorda Ermisch, 1950
 Stenomordella Ermisch, 1941
 Stenomordellaria Ermisch, 1950
 Stenomordellariodes Ermisch, 1954
 †Succimorda Kubisz, 2001 Baltic amber, Eocene
 Tolidomordella Ermisch, 1950
 Tolidomoxia Ermisch, 1950
 Tomoxia Costa, 1854
 Tomoxioda Ermisch, 1950
 Trichotomoxia Franciscolo, 1950
 Variimorda Méquignon, 1946
 Wittmerimorda Franciscolo, 1952
 Yakuhananomia Kônô, 1935
 Zeamordella Broun, 1886
 Tribe Mordellistenini Ermisch, 1941
 Asiatolida Shiyake, 2000
 Calyce Champion, 1891
 Calycemorda Ermisch, 1969
 Calyceoidea Ermisch, 1969
 Dellamora Normand, 1916
 Diversimorda Ermisch, 1969
 Ermischiella Franciscolo, 1950
 Fahraeusiella Ermisch, 1953
 Falsomordellina Nomura, 1966
 Falsomordellistena Ermisch, 1941
 Falsopseudomoxia Franciscolo, 1965
 Glipostena Ermisch, 1941
 Glipostenoda Ermisch, 1950
 Gymnostena Franciscolo, 1950
 Mordellina Schilsky, 1908
 Mordellistena Costa, 1854
 Mordellistenalia Ermisch, 1958
 Mordellistenochroa Horák, 1982
 Mordellistenoda Ermisch, 1941
 Mordellistenula Stchegoleva-Barowskaja, 1930
 Mordellochroa Emery, 1876
 Mordellochroidea Ermisch, 1969
 Mordelloxena Franciscolo, 1950
 Morphomordellochroa Ermisch, 1969
 Neomordellistena Ermisch, 1950
 Palmorda Ermisch, 1969
 Palpomorda Ermisch, 1969
 Paramordellistena Ermisch, 1950
 Phunginus Píc, 1922
 Pselaphokentron Franciscolo, 1955
 Pseudodellamora Ermisch, 1942
 Pseudotolida Ermisch, 1950
 Raymordella Franciscolo, 1956
 Tolida Mulsant, 1856
 Tolidopalpus Ermisch, 1951
 Tolidostena Ermisch, 1942
 Uhligia Horák, 1990
 Xanthomorda Ermisch, 1968
 Tribe Reynoldsiellini Franciscolo, 1957
 Reynoldsiella Ray, 1930
 Tribe Stenaliini Franciscolo, 1956
 Brodskyella Horák, 1989
 Pselaphostena Franciscolo, 1950
 Stenalia Mulsant, 1856
 Stenaliodes Franciscolo, 1956
†Subfamily Praemordellinae Shchegoleva-Barovskaya 1929
†Bellimordella Liu et al. 2008 Yixian Formation, China, Aptian
†Cretanaspis Huang and Yang 1999 Lushangfen Formation, China, Aptian
†Mirimordella Liu et al. 2007 Yixian Formation, China, Aptian
†Praemordella Shchegoleva-Barovskaya 1929 Karabastau Formation, Kazakhstan, Oxfordian
†Wuhua Wang and Zhang 2011 Daohugou, China, Callovian

References

External links

 Nomen.at

 
Polyphaga families